Ayippuzha is a hamlet (thorp) in Pattannur, the Kannur district, state of Kerala, India. It lies on the banks of the Irikkur River, in the south part of Pattannur. Economically and geographically, it is a part of the town of Irikkur, in the government records.

History
Ayipuzha has its own history

Education 
 The Government Upper Primary School
 The Ayippuzha Madrasah
 The AMI English Medium School (under supervision of Ayippuzha Jumah Mahal committee)
 Cambridge English Medium School CBSE
 Norul Huda Madrassa Koorari

Politics
Ayippuzha belongs in following category:
Panchayat: Koodali
Village: Pattannoor
Block Panchayath: Iritty
Assembly: Mattanur
Parliament: kannur

Community 
The majority of the population is Muslim (Approximately 95%), but a few Hindu families live there.

Financial Background 
Business: Almost 65% of the people depend upon the timber/wood industries located at the Ayippuzha mill. Other companies are located engaged in agriculture (Coconut and Cashew-nut, Black Pepper, Rubber...).
Much of the income is provided by ex-pats, people working in the Gulf countries and other states in India, in different fields and now almost every family has one or more men earning in the Gulf region.

Banks 
There are four banks in Ayippuzha:
Pattanoor Co operative bank
Pattanoor Co operative bank Evening Branch
Koodali Public Servants Society
Mattannoor Cooperative Rural Bank
Mattannoor Cooperative Rural Bank Evening Branch.

Govt Offices 
Public Works Department (PWD) office
Situated in nearby Irikkur Bridge

Ayippuzha government U P school

Demographics 
Muslims make up the majority of the population. There are 7 mosques in Ayippuzha.

UDF have strong presence. IUML is a major political party in ayippuzha, other Party INC, INL and CPI(M).

Ashraf K P(IUML) representing the member of panchayath.

Mr. Anees K A is president of Ayippuzha Jumahth Mahal committee.

Kooran, Puthiya Purayil, Kinakool and Nadukandy, AND KV.HOUSE- Vayatt House, Valapinakath, Alakkandy, Thalappad etc are the famous family in Ayippuzha. 

there is one famous public figure Mr. Sayyed Mash hoor Attakkoya Thangal Ayippuzha

Transportation
The national highway passes through Taliparamba town. Mangalore and Mumbai can be accessed on the northern side and Cochin and Thiruvananthapuram can be accessed on the southern side.  The road to the east connects to Mysore and Bangalore. The nearest railway station is Kannur on Mangalore-Palakkad line. There are airports at Kannur, Mangalore and Calicut.

References

Villages near Irikkur